Komsa is a mesolithic culture of Northern Norway.

Komsa may also refer to:

 Komša, a tributary of the Pek River of Serbia
 Kŏmsa, a village in Chorwon County, North Korea
 Komsa Mountain in Queen Maud Land, Antarctica
 Xalam, known in Hausa as komsa, a stringed musical instrument

See also 
 COMSA (disambiguation)
 Joseph Kosma, a Hungarian-French composer
 KOSMA, a radio telescope in Switzerland